Martin Munyanyi (3 January 1956 – 15 May 2022) was a Zimbabwean clergyman and bishop for the Roman Catholic Diocese of Gweru. He became ordained in 1983. He was appointed bishop in 2006. He resigned in 2012.

References

1956 births
2022 deaths
21st-century Roman Catholic bishops in Zimbabwe
People from Masvingo Province
Roman Catholic bishops of Gweru
Pontifical Urban University alumni